Sifen Town, is an urban town in Liling City, Zhuzhou City, Hunan Province, People's Republic of China.

Cityscape
The town is divided into 12 villages and 3 communities, the following areas: Chezhan Community, Nongchang Community, Lintian Community, Shiwan Village, Jianshang Village, Sifen Village, Chenjialong Village, Maotian Village, Jingtang Village, Futian Village, Chabutang Village, Shuangtang Village, Shihu Village, and Hejialong Village (车站社区、农场社区、林田社区、石湾村、枧上村、泗汾村、陈家垅村、茂田村、经塘村、符田村、淇田村、茶埠塘村、双塘村、石虎村、荷家垅村).

External links

Divisions of Liling